Conall may refer to the following:

Persons
Saint Conal, 5th century Irish Saint
Conall mac Taidg, Scottish king
Conall Cremthainne, Irish king
Conall Grant (died 718), Irish King
Conall Gulban, Irish king
Conall Crandomna, Scottish king
Conall Guthbinn, Irish king
Conall mac Comgaill, Scottish king
Conall mac Áedáin, Scottish King

Mythology
Conall Cernach, Irish mythic warrior
Conall Collamrach, legendary Irish king

Other
Conall Cra Bhuidhe, Scottish fairy tales